Alago, or Idoma Nokwu, is an Idomoid language spoken by the Sub-Saharan peoples of Nigeria.

There are several dialects of the language, with the main one being Keana. Additional dialects are:

 Agwatashi
 Akpanaja
 Aloshi
 Ana
 Assaikio
 Doma
 Ibi

References

Idomoid languages